Te Anau is a town in the Southland region of the South Island of New Zealand. In Maori, Te-Anau means the Place of the Swirling Waters. It is on the eastern shore of Lake Te Anau in Fiordland.  Te Anau is 155 kilometres north of  Invercargill and 171 kilometres  to the southwest of Queenstown (via state highway 6). Manapouri lies 21 kilometres to the south. Te Anau lies at the southern end of the Milford Road, (State Highway 94) 117 kilometres to the south of Milford Sound.

History 
The first Europeans (C.J. Nairn and W.J. Stephen) to visit the lake were led by Maori guides visited in 1852. The lake was formally surveyed first in 1863. The township was surveyed in 1893. This was soon after the Milford Track opened. The town only really started to grow after the opening of the Homer Tunnel and road route to Milford in 1953.

Demographics 

Te Anau had a population of 2,538 at the 2018 New Zealand census, an increase of 537 people (26.8%) since the 2013 census, and an increase of 603 people (31.2%) since the 2006 census. There were 987 households. There were 1,263 males and 1,278 females, giving a sex ratio of 0.99 males per female. The median age was 39.4 years (compared with 37.4 years nationally), with 441 people (17.4%) aged under 15 years, 453 (17.8%) aged 15 to 29, 1,221 (48.1%) aged 30 to 64, and 423 (16.7%) aged 65 or older.

Ethnicities were 82.9% European/Pākehā, 8.4% Māori, 1.1% Pacific peoples, 11.8% Asian, and 3.8% other ethnicities (totals add to more than 100% since people could identify with multiple ethnicities).

The proportion of people born overseas was 25.2%, compared with 27.1% nationally.

Although some people objected to giving their religion, 58.9% had no religion, 30.6% were Christian, 1.4% were Hindu, 0.5% were Muslim, 0.7% were Buddhist and 2.1% had other religions.

Of those at least 15 years old, 387 (18.5%) people had a bachelor or higher degree, and 354 (16.9%) people had no formal qualifications. The median income was $33,900, compared with $31,800 nationally. 249 people (11.9%) earned over $70,000 compared to 17.2% nationally. The employment status of those at least 15 was that 1,287 (61.4%) people were employed full-time, 345 (16.5%) were part-time, and 18 (0.9%) were unemployed.

Whitestone

Whitestone had a population of 618 at the 2018 New Zealand census, an increase of 78 people (14.4%) since the 2013 census, and an increase of 240 people (63.5%) since the 2006 census. There were 231 households. There were 315 males and 303 females, giving a sex ratio of 1.04 males per female. The median age was 48.9 years (compared with 37.4 years nationally), with 108 people (17.5%) aged under 15 years, 81 (13.1%) aged 15 to 29, 309 (50.0%) aged 30 to 64, and 120 (19.4%) aged 65 or older.

Ethnicities were 96.1% European/Pākehā, 10.2% Māori, 0.0% Pacific peoples, 1.9% Asian, and 1.9% other ethnicities (totals add to more than 100% since people could identify with multiple ethnicities).

The proportion of people born overseas was 14.1%, compared with 27.1% nationally.

Although some people objected to giving their religion, 60.7% had no religion, 33.5% were Christian, 0.5% were Buddhist and 0.0% had other religions.

Of those at least 15 years old, 111 (21.8%) people had a bachelor or higher degree, and 90 (17.6%) people had no formal qualifications. The median income was $43,600, compared with $31,800 nationally. 132 people (25.9%) earned over $70,000 compared to 17.2% nationally. The employment status of those at least 15 was that 318 (62.4%) people were employed full-time, 99 (19.4%) were part-time, and 0 (0.0%) were unemployed.

Economy 

Tourism and farming are the predominant economic activities in the area. Lying as it does at the borders of Fiordland National Park, it is the gateway to a wilderness area famed for tramping and spectacular scenery.  Many tourists come to Te Anau to visit the famous nearby fiords Milford Sound / Piopiotahi and Doubtful Sound / Patea. The town is also used as a base for those undertaking the Milford Track and the Kepler Track, the latter being a 4-day loop from Te Anau. Visitors to the area also partake in activities such as kayaking, cycling, jet boat riding, fishing and hunting, farm tours and seaplane/helicopter sightseeing. In 2014, readers of New Zealand's Wilderness magazine voted Te Anau as the best location in New Zealand for tramping (hiking) opportunities. The town has a wide range of accommodation, with over 4,000 beds available in summer.

Geography 
Lake Te Anau is the largest lake in the South Island and within New Zealand second only to Lake Taupō. Rising on the west side of Lake Te Anau, the Kepler and Murchison mountain ranges are evident from most of Te Anau. Many species of bird life are also found locally, notably the endangered Takahē which can be found  at the Fiordland Wildlife Park.  The Department of Conservation office in Te Anau is active in protecting endangered native birds

Attractions 
Te Anau hosts the Kepler Challenge in early December each year.

A local attraction is the Te Ana-au Caves across Lake Te Anau from the town. The caves include an underground glowworm grotto, which can be viewed from a punt during daily guided tours.

Education 
Fiordland College is a secondary school for years 7 to 13 with a roll of  students. The college was established in 1976.

Te Anau School - Te Kura o Te Anau is a contributing primary school for years 1 to 6 with a roll of  students. The school first opened in 1937.

Both schools are coeducational. Rolls are as of

Transport 
It was proposed in 2016 to develop the airport in order to enable commercial flights in from Christchurch in order to boost tourism.

State highway 94 approaches the town from the east and is the most important corridor connecting Te Anau and its surrounds to the rest of the South Island highway network. SH94 also connects through to Milford sound.

There are a number of private bus operators that connect Te Anau to; Invercargill, Queenstown, smaller nearby towns, and various trailheads or tourist attractions in the area. Timetables are often seasonal with more in summer and less in winter. There are also a large number of buses that travel through Te Anau while going between Queenstown and Milford Sound as a part of one-day package experiences.

The Southern Scenic Route, a signposted route travelling on a number of different State Highways and local roads travels through Te Anau.

Daylight savings 
Te Anau proposed to make daylight savings permanent in the town in 2021. This would give tourists an extra hour to see the sights. Locals propose to call this "Te Anau time".

References

External links

 Visit Fiordland- the Regional Tourism Organisation for the Fiordland region
Historic images of Te Anau from the collection of the Museum of New Zealand Te Papa Tongarewa

 
Fiordland
Populated places in Southland, New Zealand
Southern Scenic Route
Populated lakeshore places in New Zealand